Adobe Fresco is a vector and raster graphics editor developed by Adobe primarily for digital painting. Originally designed for the Apple iPad with Pencil support, development for Adobe Fresco began in late 2019. Along with Creative Cloud, Fresco was released as part of CC 2019.

History 
Adobe Fresco for iPad with Pencil support was first announced in November 2018, and was released in November 2019 as said in Adobe MAX 2019.

The Adobe Fresco app has since been made free of charge to use, but it has a premium subscription that can be purchased separately or along with the Creative Cloud All Apps subscription.

Features 
The user interface contains different features including Live Brushes, basic photo editing, layering, and more. The sidebars that are found at each edge of the screen contains a variety of tools to select, create, and manipulate objects or artworks in Fresco. These tools can be selected as following: drawing, typing, painting, reshaping, slicing and cutting, symbolism, moving and zooming, and sketching.

Release history 
Release history of Adobe Fresco, sorted by version number

See also 

 Adobe Illustrator
 Autodesk SketchBook
 Krita

References

External links
 

Adobe software
Raster graphics editors
IOS software